= Galilea =

Galilea may refer to:

- Galilea, a synonym for a genus of plants, Cyperus
- Galilee, a region located in northern Israel and southern Lebanon
